Augusto Magli (9 March 1923 – 1 November 1998) was an Italian footballer who played as a midfielder.

Club career
Nicknamed 'Mancino', Augusto Magli made his debut in Serie A when he was 17 years old with Fiorentina and played for the Florence side until 1954, just after reaching 30 years of age. At Fiorentina he became the club's star player, although unfortunately they were a mid-table team in those years. He then left Fiorentina for Udinese which finished in second place behind A.C. Milan in Serie A during the 1954–55 season. He then retired at the age of 35 after playing for Roma.

International career
Magli made his only appearance for the national team at the 1950 World Cup in the opening match against Sweden.

References

1923 births
1998 deaths
People from Molinella
Italian footballers
Association football midfielders
ACF Fiorentina players
Bologna F.C. 1909 players
Udinese Calcio players
A.S. Roma players
Serie A players
Italy international footballers
1950 FIFA World Cup players
Molinella Calcio 1911 players
Italy B international footballers
Footballers from Emilia-Romagna
Sportspeople from the Metropolitan City of Bologna